The 1928–29 Swiss International Ice Hockey Championship was the 14th edition of the international ice hockey championship in Switzerland. HC Davos won the championship by defeating Star Lausanne in the final.

First round

Eastern Series 
EHC St. Moritz opted not to participate in the International Championship.

 HC Davos - EHC St. Moritz 5:0 (Forfeit)

HC Davos qualified for the final.

Western Series 
 Star Lausanne - HC Rosey Gstaad 0:8

HC Rosey Gstaad did not participate in the final due to issues with the National Championship Final. Star Lausanne qualified for the final as a result.

Final 
 HC Davos - Star Lausanne 9:0

External links 
Swiss Ice Hockey Federation – All-time results

Inter
Swiss International Ice Hockey Championship seasons